Aces High was a comic book series published by EC Comics in 1955 as the fourth title in its New Direction line. The bi-monthly comic was published by Bill Gaines. It lasted a total of five issues before being cancelled, along with EC's other New Direction comics.

Aces High was dedicated to tales of air combat and front line service of Allied airmen during World War I and World War II. Many of the stories were in an anti-war vein.

Contributors to Aces High include George Evans, Wally Wood, Jack Davis and Bernie Krigstein.

Aces High was reprinted as part of publisher Russ Cochran's Complete EC Library in 1988.  Between April and August 1999, Cochran (in association with Gemstone Publishing) reprinted all five individual issues.  This complete run was later rebound, with covers included, in a single softcover EC Annual.

Issue guide

References 
Interview with Bill Gaines (1991)
George Evans: Aviation Ace in the Panels by Steve Stiles

EC Comics publications
War comics
Aviation comics
Comics by Carl Wessler
1955 comics debuts
1955 comics endings